Psomi is a Greek islet close to the island of Kastellorizo. Its area is 0.0035 km2, and according to the 2011 Greek population census, it didn't have any residents.

Fauna 

Psomi is the only place in Greece where the lizard Anatololacerta finikensis has been found. Kotschy's gecko was also discovered in the island.

References 

Landforms of Rhodes (regional unit)
Islands of the South Aegean